Susan Skerman (born 1928) is a New Zealand artist.

Early life  
Skerman was born in Te Awamutu, Waikato, New Zealand, in 1928.

Education 
Skerman was educated at Nga Tawa Diocesan School and the Ilam School of Fine Arts at the University of Canterbury. She then attended the Central School of Art and Craft in London between 1953 and 1955.

Career 
Skerman's first solo exhibition was in Hamilton, 1955. She has also exhibited with:
 Auckland Society of Arts
 New Zealand Academy of Fine Arts
 The Group in 1971
 the Print Council of New Zealand Fifth National Touring Exhibition 1974-1975
Her works were included in the 'bush walk' at Expo '70, a world's fair held in Osaka, Japan. Following the exhibition, the pieces were hung in the New Zealand parliament's Beehive building in Wellington. Skerman also exhibited the works in 2014 at the Waikato District Health Board's Older Persons and Rehabilitation Building, where the pieces remain on permanent display.

Works by Skerman are held in the collection of the Museum of New Zealand Te Papa Tongarewa.

References

Further reading 
Artist files for Skerman are held at:
 E. H. McCormick Research Library, Auckland Art Gallery Toi o Tāmaki
 Hocken Collections Uare Taoka o Hākena
 Te Aka Matua Research Library, Museum of New Zealand Te Papa Tongarewa
Also see:
 Concise Dictionary of New Zealand Artists, McGahey, Kate (2000) Gilt Edge
 Prints and Printmakers in New Zealand Peter Cape (1974) Collins

1928 births
New Zealand women artists
New Zealand women painters
Ilam School of Fine Arts alumni
People associated with the Museum of New Zealand Te Papa Tongarewa
People from Te Awamutu
Alumni of the Central School of Art and Design
Living people
People associated with the Auckland Society of Arts
People educated at Nga Tawa Diocesan School
People associated with The Group (New Zealand art)